Cao Li (208 – May or June 229) was a prince in the state of Cao Wei in the Three Kingdoms period of China. He was a son of Cao Pi, the first emperor of Wei. His mother, Consort Xu (徐姬), was a concubine of Cao Pi. He had two full sisters: the elder one was Princess Linfen (臨汾公主) while the younger one, who was unnamed, died early. Cao Li was enfeoffed as the Duke of Qin (秦公) in 221, with his dukedom in Jingzhao Commandery (京兆郡). In 222, he was elevated to the status of Prince of Jingzhao (京兆王). In 225, his title was changed to Prince of Yuancheng (元城王). He died in 229 during the reign of his half-brother Cao Rui. He has no offspring.

In 231, Since Cao Li had no descendants, Cao Rui designated Cao Ti (曹悌), a son of Cao Kai (曹楷) and grandson of Cao Zhang, as Cao Li's heir; Cao Ti thus became the new Prince of Yuancheng. In 232, Cao Ti's title was changed to Prince of Liang (梁王). Throughout the reigns of the subsequent Wei emperors, the number of taxable households in Cao Ti's princedom increased until it reached 4,500.

See also
 Cao Wei family trees#Consort Xu
 Lists of people of the Three Kingdoms

Notes

References

 Chen, Shou (3rd century). Records of the Three Kingdoms (Sanguozhi).
 Hang, Shijun (18th century). Sanguozhi buzhu (三國志補注; Additional notes on Records of the Three Kingdoms).

208 births
229 deaths
Cao Wei imperial princes